Marcia Marcus (born January 11, 1928) is an American figurative painter of portraits, self-portraits, still life, and landscape.

Early life and education
Marcus was born on January 11, 1928, in New York City. She earned her B.F.A. at New York University in 1949, followed by studies at Cooper Union in 1950–1952, and with Edwin Dickinson at the Art Students League in 1954. Her classmates in school at Cooper Union included Alex Katz and Lois Dodd, during this time she also worked alongside her friend painter Anthony Toney. In the 1950s she was working in the intersection of performance art (through happenings) and portraiture.

Work
Marcia Marcus's "Happening," entitled In the Garden: A Ballet, was performed by Red Grooms and Bob Thompson at the Delancey Street Museum in 1960. In 1963 and 1965 Marcus's work was included in the biennial exhibition at the Whitney Museum of American Art. In 1962 until 1963 she was the recipient of a Fulbright Fellowship to France.

She taught at many institutions, including Purdue University; Moore College of Art and Design; Rhode Island School of Design; Cooper Union; Louisiana State University; New York University; Vassar College; Cornell University; Iowa State University; and Northern Arizona University.

Although known for self-portraits, Marcus painted portraits of many people associated with the arts including collectors, critics and fellow artists. Among those Marcus depicted in her paintings were Jill Johnston, Red Grooms, Lucas Samaras, Willem de Kooning, Sari Dienes, Henry Geldzahler, Myron Stout, Bob Thompson, and Roy Neuberger. Many of her works visually address issues like female desire, race, and motherhood.

Her work is in various public museum collections including the Whitney Museum of American Art, Smithsonian American Art Museum, Hirshhorn Museum and Sculpture Garden, Minneapolis Institute of Art, Albright-Knox Art Gallery, Philadelphia Museum of Art, National Museum of Women in the Arts, Williams College Museum of Art, the University of Colorado at Boulder Museum, and the Maier Museum of Art at Randolph College.

Awards
 1961 – Walter Gutman Fund
 1962–1963 – Fulbright Fellowship to France
 1964, 1977, 1982 – Imgram-Merrill Award
 1964 – Rosenthal Award
 1964, 1971 – Childe Hassam Fund Purchase
 1966 – Ford Foundation, Artist in Residence Grant to the Rhode Island School of Design Museum
 1991–1992 – National Endowment for the Arts, Painting
 1993 – Pollock-Krasner

References

External links
 
 Marcia Marcus papers, 1934-1983, at the Archives of American Art, Smithsonian

1928 births
Living people
20th-century American painters
20th-century American women artists
21st-century American women artists
Modern painters
American Figurative Expressionism
Painters from New York City
New York University alumni
Cooper Union alumni
Art Students League of New York alumni